Michael Mayer may refer to:

 Michael Mayer (American football) (born 2001), American football tight end
 Michael Mayer (director) (born 1960), American theatrical and film director
 Michael Mayer (footballer) (born 1970), German football midfielder
 Michael Mayer (musician) (born 1971), German electronic musician
 Michael Mayer (volleyball) (born 1980), German volleyball player
 Mike Mayer, American actor, screenwriter, and director

See also
Mike Mayers (born 1991), American professional baseball player
Mike-Mayer (surname)
Michael Meyer (disambiguation)
Michael Myers (disambiguation)